Country Partners is the fourth collaborative studio album by Conway Twitty and Loretta Lynn. It was released on June 10, 1974, by MCA Records.

Critical reception

The Billboard review published in the June 22, 1974 issue said, "Tremendous singing partners they are, and joined once more in a collection which will surprise many of their closest fans. A couple of the tunes border on pop, and it's a great change of pace for them. But there's plenty of country and, as usual, excellent material." The review noted "I'm Getting Tired of Losing You", "Sweet Things Remember About You", and the fast-paced "It All Falls Down" as the best cuts on the album. A note to album dealers said, "The cover alone should help make this saleable."

Cashbox published a review in the June 22, 1974 issue saying, "Loretta Lynn and Conway Twitty stand as two of the leading singers on the country scene. Both tremendously talented in their own careers, when they make an LP together you can be sure that it is going to be very special. The LP kicks off with their latest chart novelty single entitled "As Soon as I Hang Up the Phone". "Don't Mess Up a Good Thing" is an up-tempo tune that blends these two superb voices together and augments the track with some excellent instrumentation. "Two Lonely People" is a moving
ballad that will at once capture your heart. Also included in this fine LP are "Spiders and Snakes", "Country Bumpkin", and "It All Falls Down"."

Commercial performance
The album peaked at No. 1 on the US Billboard Hot Country LP's chart, the duo's second album to top the chart.

The album's only single, "As Soon as I Hang Up the Phone", was released in May 1974 and peaked at No. 1 on the US Billboard Hot Country Singles chart, their fourth consecutive No. 1 single together. In Canada, the single peaked at No. 1 on the RPM Country Singles chart, the duo's third consecutive songs to top the chart. The single peaked at No. 57 on the Kent Music Report in Australia.

Recording 
Recording sessions for the album took place on April 23, 24 and 25, 1974, at Bradley's Barn in Mount Juliet, Tennessee. Two songs on the album were recorded during the sessions for 1973's Louisiana Woman, Mississippi Man. "As Soon as I Hang Up the Phone" was recorded on March 7, 1973, and "Lifetime Before" was recorded on April 5.

Track listing

Personnel
Adapted from the album liner notes and MCA recording session records.
Harold Bradley – bass guitar
Owen Bradley – producer
Ray Edenton – acoustic guitar
Bud Gray – photography
John Hughey – steel guitar
Loretta Lynn – lead vocals
Tommy Markham – drums
Grady Martin – guitar
The Nashville Sounds – background vocals
Bob Moore – bass
Hargus Robbins – piano
Conway Twitty – lead vocals

Charts
Album

Singles

References 

1974 albums
Vocal duet albums
Loretta Lynn albums
Conway Twitty albums
Albums produced by Owen Bradley
Decca Records albums